The 1949 East Texas State Lions football team was an American football team that represented East Texas State Teachers College—now known as Texas A&M University–Commerce–as a member of the Lone Star Conference (LSC) during the 1949 college football season. Led by 11th-year head coach Bob Berry, the Lions compiled an overall record of 5–3–1 with a mark of 3–0 in conference play, winning the LSC title.

Schedule

References

East Texas State
Texas A&M–Commerce Lions football seasons
Lone Star Conference football champion seasons
East Texas State Lions football